Majera (Mazera) is a minor Afro-Asiatic language of Chad and Cameroon.

Majéra is spoken in and around Majéra in the arrondissement of Zina (Logone-et-Chari Department, Far North Region). In the 1980s, there were 5,000 speakers or slightly less in Cameroon (ALCAM 1984). It is also spoken in Chad.

References

Biu-Mandara languages
Languages of Chad
Languages of Cameroon